o-Coumaric acid is a hydroxycinnamic acid, an organic compound that is a hydroxy derivative of cinnamic acid. There are three isomers of coumaric acids — o-coumaric acid, m-coumaric acid, and p-coumaric acid — that differ by the position of the hydroxy substitution of the phenyl group.

Natural occurrence 
o-Coumaric acid can be found in vinegar.

2-Coumarate reductase is an enzyme that produces 2-coumarate from 3-(2-hydroxyphenyl)propanoate and NAD+. This enzyme participates in phenylalanine metabolism.

References

External links 
 o-Coumaric acid at www.phenol-explorer.eu

Hydroxycinnamic acids
Vinylogous carboxylic acids